Southwest [Senior] High School (SHS), in San Diego, California, United States, is a high school established in 1975. It was built on the site of a small railroad yard owned by the Southern Pacific Railroad along the original San Diego-Tijuana line. It existed until the mid-1930s when the tracks were moved east to the present-day Trolley tracks. Part of the Sweetwater Union High School District, it serves all socioeconomic communities of San Diego (specifically the Nestor community), as well as some students living in Chula Vista, Imperial Beach and San Ysidro. The school serves approximately 1,750 students. The school has a rivalry with fellow Sweetwater Union High School District school, Mar Vista, most notably the annual Battle of the Bell football game.

Alma mater
O’er the horizon of victory
Our Southwest sun,
Shines through with spirit free.
The Red the Gold we will truly see,
Beyond the Raider dawn.
We hail the Red, the Gold, the White
In our faithful song.
With loyal courage we raise our hands,
Eternal glory we command,
Southwest High forever, ever stand.

Academics
The school has shown remarkable achievements in academic competitions such as Academic Decathlon, in which they held 6 consecutive county titles from 2003–2008 and received 3rd place in the 2009 and 2010 competitions. Along with these six consecutive county titles, Southwest High School is the first school in San Diego County to have achieved five and later six consecutive county titles. The Varsity Academic League won eight varsity Metro [District] championship titles in 1999, 2001, 2003–2007, and 2009. The Varsity won their division nine times in 1999, 2001, and 2003–2010. The varsity team in 2005 concluded their season by winning the County Academic League title beating La Jolla High School 124–53 making it the highest score in San Diego County Academic League championship history. For their accomplishments in League and Decathlon the San Diego County School Board declared in 2005 that June 17 would be known as Southwest High Academics Day. The JV Academic League held 8 consecutive Metro championship titles from 2001–2008 and have won their division for 10 years in a row from 2001-2010 (also an 11th win back in 1999).

Athletics 
The Southwest Raiders sports teams represent the Southwest Senior High School in high school sports programs. Mar Vista High is known as the athletic rival of the school

Notable alumni

 Frankie J - Mexican-American Latin Pop and Adult Contemporary singer.
 
 Damon Washington- Professional American football player
 Adrian Garcia Marquez- Sportscaster, Sports Announcer (Fox Sports, ESPN Radio, MLB, NFL, San Diego Chargers)
 Chris Martin - Professional Boxer, Current WBO-NABO Jr. Featherweight Champion
 Rene Ortiz- Former Professional Soccer player in San Diego Sockers (1978-96) and Professional Coach of Mexico national futsal team

See also
 Primary and secondary schools in San Diego, California
 List of high schools in San Diego County, California
 List of high schools in California

References

External links
 School Website
 Raider's Digest

High schools in San Diego
Public high schools in California
1975 establishments in California